Frederick Fisher McCulloch (March 5, 1892 – August 11, 1966) was a Canadian professional ice hockey player. He played with the Victoria Aristocrats of the Pacific Coast Hockey Association during the 1915–16 season.

Prior to joining the PCHA McCulloch had won the Allan Cup (as Canadian national amateur champions) in 1914 with the Regina Victorias.

References

1892 births
1951 deaths
People from Carleton Place
Victoria Cougars (1911–1926) players
Canadian ice hockey goaltenders